Max Caron (born August 20, 1989) is a former Canadian football linebacker. He was drafted by the Calgary Stampeders in the second round of the 2014 CFL Draft, but only appeared in two career games due to injury. He announced his retirement from professional football on May 22, 2017.

References 

1989 births
Living people
Sportspeople from Kingston, Ontario
Canadian football linebackers
Concordia Stingers football players
Calgary Stampeders players
Players of Canadian football from Ontario